Micrurapteryx kollariella is a moth of the family Gracillariidae. It is known from all of Europe, except the British Islands and Fennoscandia.

The larvae feed on Chamaecytisus hirsutus, Cytisus scoparius, Cytisus sessilifolius, Genista germanica, Genista sericea, Genista tinctoria, Laburnum anagyroides, Lembotropis nigricans, Lupinus and Petteria ramentacea. They mine the leaves of their host plant. The mine starts as a starlike, lobed blotch on top of the midrib. It develops into an upper-surface blotch that occupies almost the entire leaflet. The colour is light green at first, but soon turns brown. Almost all frass is ejected out of the mine. The larva may leave the mine and start mining elsewhere. Pupation takes place outside of the mine.

References

External links
Lepiforum.de

Gracillariinae
Moths of Europe
Moths of Asia
Moths described in 1839